Anthophagus alpinus  is a species of rove beetles native to Europe.

References

Staphylinidae
Beetles described in 1790
Beetles of Europe